In chemistry, a monomer (mono-, "one" + -mer, "part") is a molecule (mostly organic) that can react together with other monomer molecules to form a larger polymer chain or three-dimensional network in a process called polymerization.

Classification
Monomers can be classified in many ways.  They can be subdivided into two classes, depending on the kind of the polymer that they form.  Monomers that participate in condensation polymerization have a different stoichiometry than monomers that participate in addition polymerization:  

Other classifications include:
natural vs synthetic monomers, e.g. glycine vs caprolactam, respectively
polar vs nonpolar monomers, e.g. vinyl acetate vs ethylene, respectively
cyclic vs linear, e.g. ethylene oxide vs ethylene glycol, respectively

The polymerization of one kind of monomer gives a homopolymer.  Many polymers are copolymers, meaning that they are derived from two different monomers.  In the case of condensation polymerizations, the ratio of comonomers is usually 1:1.  For example, the formation of many nylons requires equal amounts of a dicarboxylic acid and diamine.  In the case of addition polymerizations, the comonomer content is often only a few percent.  For example, small amounts of 1-octene monomer are copolymerized with ethylene to give specialized polyethylene.

Synthetic monomers
 Ethylene gas (H2C=CH2) is the monomer for polyethylene.
 Other modified ethylene derivatives include:
tetrafluoroethylene (F2C=CF2) which leads to Teflon
vinyl chloride (H2C=CHCl) which leads to PVC
styrene (C6H5CH=CH2) which leads to polystyrene
 Epoxide monomers may be cross linked with themselves, or with the addition of a co-reactant, to form epoxy
 BPA is the monomer precursor for polycarbonate
 Terephthalic acid is a comonomer that, with ethylene glycol, forms polyethylene terephthalate.
 Dimethylsilicon dichloride is a monomer that, upon hydrolysis, gives polydimethylsiloxane.
 Ethyl methacrylate is an acrylic monomer that, when combined with an acrylic polymer, catalyzes and forms an acrylate plastic used to create artificial nail extensions

Biopolymers
The term "monomeric protein" may also be used to describe one of the proteins making up a multiprotein complex.

Natural monomers
Some of the main biopolymers are listed below:

Amino acids
For proteins, the monomers are amino acids. Polymerization occurs at ribosomes. Usually about 20 types of amino acid monomers are used to produce proteins. Hence proteins are not homopolymers.

Nucleotides 
For polynucleic acids (DNA/RNA), the monomers are nucleotides, each of which is made of a pentose sugar, a nitrogenous base and a phosphate group.  Nucleotide monomers are found in the cell nucleus.  Four types of nucleotide monomers are precursors to DNA and four different nucleotide monomers are precursors to RNA.

Glucose and related sugars
For carbohydrates, the monomers are monosaccharides. The most abundant natural monomer is glucose, which is linked by glycosidic bonds into the polymers cellulose, starch, and glycogen.

Isoprene
Isoprene is a natural monomer that polymerizes to form a natural rubber, most often cis-1,4-polyisoprene, but also trans-1,4-polymer.  Synthetic rubbers are often based on butadiene, which is structurally related to isoprene.

See also
 Protein subunit
 List of publications in polymer chemistry
 Prepolymer

Notes